Gustavo A. Stolovitzky is an Argentine-American computational systems biologist. He is an IBM Fellow and the Director of the Translational Systems Biology and Nano-Biotechnology Program at IBM Research.
He serves as the program director of the Thomas J. Watson Research Center's Translational Systems Biology and Nanobiotechnology Program, as well as an Adjunct professor of Genetics and Genomic Sciences at the Icahn School of Medicine at Mount Sinai and an Adjunct Associate Professor of Biomedical Informatics at Columbia University. His research has been cited more than 20,000 times

Stolovitzky is a co-founder of the Dialogue for Reverse Engineering Assessments and Methods (DREAM). DREAM is an international collaborative effort to recognize effective methods in systems biology and consists of more than 15,000 participants. Stolovitzky won the IBM Fellow award for pioneering the use of crowdsourcing for research in computational biology.

Career
Stolovitzky received his M.Sc. in physics from the University of Buenos Aires in 1987, and his PhD in mechanical engineering from Yale University in 1994. In 1998, Stolovitzky joined IBM Research to work in the field of computational systems biology; he has since become the director of IBM's Translational Systems Biology and Nano-Biotechnology Program. He is also an adjunct professor at Columbia University and a postdoctoral researcher at the Center for Studies in Physics and Biology at The Rockefeller University. In 2005, Stolovitzky and Jared Roach developed sophisticated methods for the analysis of Massively Parallel Signature Sequencing (MPSS) data. In 2008, he was a visiting scholar at the Institute for Advanced Study.

Solovitztky has advocated the usage of crowdsourcing as a tool for scientific research.

Recognition
Stolovitzky has received the Hispanic Engineer National Achievement Awards Corporation (HENAAC)'s Pioneer Award for Great Minds in STEM and the World Technology Award in Biotechnology in 2013, and the Raíces Prize from the Argentinian government in 2017. Stolovitzky is also a member of the IBM Academy of Technology and has been inducted as a Fellow of the New York Academy of Sciences, Fellow of the World Technology Network, Fellow of the American Physical Society, and Fellow of the American Association for the Advancement of Science.

In 2019, Stolovitzky was appointed as an IBM Fellow, the highest honor IBM bestows to its employees.

In 2021, Stolovitzky was elected as a Fellow of the International Society for Computational Biology.

Family 
Stolovitzky resides in the Northeastern United States with his family.

History 
Stolovitzky received his M.Sc. in physics (with honors) from the University of Buenos Aires, Argentina, in 1987 and his Ph.D. in mechanical engineering from Yale University in 1994. He later explained that during a visit he paid to a friend studying in Yale, he met with K.R. Sreenivasan, who "called the provost and asked if he could add me as a PhD student, even though I hadn't formally applied to Yale and all the deadlines had already passed." He did his postdoctorate at the Center for Studies in Physics and Biology at The Rockefeller University, following which he joined IBM Research in 1998.

Titles and awards 
Among others, Gustavo has received the following awards and titles:

 IBM Fellow
 Distinguished Research Staff Member in the IBM Computational Biology Center
 IBM Master Inventor 
 Fellow of the NY Academy of Sciences
 Fellow of the American Physical Society (2007)
 Fellow of the American Association for the Advancement of Science
 HEENAC Pioneer Award to Great Minds in STEM, awarded by the Hispanic Engineer National Achievement Awards Conference (2013)
 World Technology Awards in the Category "Biotechnology", awarded by the World Technology Network (2013)
 Henry Prentiss Becton Prize, awarded by the Faculty of Engineering at Yale University for Excellence in Engineering and Applied Science (1995)
 Fellow of the World Technology Network

Further reading 

 The website of the DREAM program

References

Year of birth missing (living people)
Living people
University of Buenos Aires alumni
Yale School of Engineering & Applied Science alumni
Columbia University faculty
IBM Fellows
Computational biologists
Argentine expatriates in the United States